Cho Jin-ho (born August 16, 1975) is a South Korean professional baseball pitcher who briefly played for the Boston Red Sox.

After finishing the 2002 season with the Pawtucket Red Sox (AAA) of the International League, Cho returned to South Korea, signing with the SK Wyverns of the KBO League. Cho had an unsuccessful 2003 with the club and in 2004 was caught in a scheme to dodge military service. He spent several years in prison and non-combat military service before returning to the mound for the Samsung Lions in 2007.

Education
 Wonkwang University
 Jeonju High School
 Jeolla Middle School
 Jeonju Jinbuk Elementary School

References

External links
Career statistics and player information from Korea Baseball Organization

1975 births
Living people
Baseball players at the 1996 Summer Olympics
Boston Red Sox players
Draft evaders
KBO League pitchers
Major League Baseball pitchers
Major League Baseball players from South Korea
Olympic baseball players of South Korea
People from Jeonju
Samsung Lions coaches
Samsung Lions players
SSG Landers players
Pawtucket Red Sox players
Sarasota Red Sox players
Trenton Thunder players
South Korean expatriate baseball players in the United States
Sportspeople from North Jeolla Province